The Valley School in Orderville, Utah was built in 1935–36, and was listed on the National Register of Historic Places in 1985.  

It is a yellow brick building, built as a Public Works Administration project.  It originally held the Orderville Elementary School on its upper, main floor, and had the adjoining high school's home economics and shop departments in its raised basement. It was designed by architects Scott & Welch in PWA Moderne style.

References

Buildings and structures in Kane County, Utah
Education in Kane County, Utah
School buildings completed in 1935
School buildings on the National Register of Historic Places in Utah
PWA Moderne architecture in Utah
National Register of Historic Places in Kane County, Utah